Wings of Death is a 1990 vertically scrolling shooter developed by Eclipse Software and published by Thalion Software for the Atari ST, then ported to the Amiga. In Wings of Death, the player controls a mage turned into a winged creature on a quest to defeat a wicked witch. The game was well received and was followed by the science fiction-themed sequel Lethal Xcess in 1991.

Gameplay

Despite its fantasy setting, Wings of Death is a standard vertically scrolling shooter in which multiple enemies in formation enter the screen from above and can either be avoided or destroyed to release power-ups. Each weapon can be upgraded several times, yielding generally more powerful versions. Changing to another weapon resets the player's upgrades. The player may transform into several forms, including a giant eagle, a griffon, and a dragon.

Plot
A spell of the evil witch queen Xandrilia transformed her hated rival, the magician Sagyr, into a winged creature. Now the player's role is to guide Sagyr in his quest to defeat the witch for once and for all, and revert into a human being. His quest takes place through seven levels, from Sagyr's castle to Xandrilia's domain.

Reception
Trenton Webb of Amiga Format, who gave the Amiga version a review rating of 76%, wrote Wings of Death is "chaotic fun, but relies too heavily on luck." Paul Roundell of Amiga Computing later opined the game was "underrated on its release."

Legacy 

A sequel to Wings of Death was released in 1991 for the same platforms. In it, the returning Sagyr fights on against Xandrilia's descendants after being transported into a distant future.

References

External links 
Official website
Wings of Death at Lemon Amiga
Wings of Death at Atari Mania
 Blazing Wings (Windows remake)

1990 video games
Amiga games
Atari ST games
Video games about dragons
Eclipse Software Design games
Fantasy video games
Vertically scrolling shooters
Single-player video games
Video games developed in Germany
Video games scored by Jochen Hippel
Video games about witchcraft
Video games about curses
Thalion Software games